The following is a list of countries by truck exports. Data is for 2012, in millions of United States dollars, as reported by The Observatory of Economic Complexity. Currently the top 21 countries are listed.

References
atlas.media.mit.edu - Observatory of Economic complexity - Countries that export Delivery Trucks (2012)

Trucks
Trucks
 Truck exports
Truck-related lists